Promontory Point may refer to:

California 
 Promontory Point (Newport Beach, California), a cape in Newport Beach, California
 Promontory Point (Tehama County, California), a summit in the Lassen National Forest in Tehama County, California

Illinois 
 Promontory Point (Chicago), a special use facility on Lake Michigan in the Chicago Park District in Chicago, Illinois

Nevada 
 Promontory Point (Nevada), a summit on a peninsula on Lake Mead in Clark County, Nevada, just north of the Hoover Dam

Utah 
 Promontory Point (Utah), a cape in Box Elder County, Utah
 Promontory Point, Utah, a ghost town on the cape
 Promontory, Utah, an unincorporated community at Promontory Summit, aka Promontory Point, a mountain gap in northern Utah where the U.S. Transcontinental Railroad connected

See also
 Promontory (disambiguation)
 Point (disambiguation)